The 1981–85 Nordic Football Championship was the 13th Nordic Football Championship staged. Four Nordic countries participated: Denmark, Finland, Norway and Sweden. Denmark won the tournament, its third Nordic Championship win.

Results

1981

1982

1983

1985

Table

Winners

Statistics

Goalscorers

See also
 Balkan Cup
 Baltic Cup
 Central European International Cup
 Mediterranean Cup

References

External links

1981-85
1981–82 in European football
1982–83 in European football
1983–84 in European football
1984–85 in European football
1981 in Swedish football
1982 in Swedish football
1983 in Swedish football
1985 in Swedish football
1981 in Danish football
1982 in Danish football
1983 in Danish football
1981 in Norwegian football
1982 in Norwegian football
1985 in Norwegian football
1981 in Finnish football
1982 in Finnish football
1983 in Finnish football